Carlos Freile Zaldumbide (18 May 1851 – 28 August 1928) was an Ecuadorian politician, who served twice as acting President of Ecuador and one term as Vice President of Ecuador.

Freile was born in Quito, Ecuador on 18 May 1851.

Freile was a wealthy landowner who pioneered the raising of Holstein livestock in Ecuador. He served as Vice President to President Eloy Alfaro Delgado from 31 August 1899 to 31 August 1903. He was President of the Senate in 1904 and again 1910–1911. He later became the acting President of Ecuador on 12 August 1911 following the overthrow and exile of President Eloy Alfaro. After 21 days in office, Freile was replaced by the newly elected President Emilio Estrada on 1 September 1911. Estrada died three months later, on 21 December 1911, and Freile again served as acting president until 6 March 1912  when he was succeeded by Francisco Andrade Marín.

He died in Paris, France on August 28, 1928.

References

External links
 Official Website of the Ecuadorian Government about the country President's History

1851 births
1928 deaths
People from Quito
Ecuadorian people of Galician descent
Presidents of Ecuador
Vice presidents of Ecuador
Presidents of the Senate of Ecuador